The B&F Fk131 Bücker Jungmann is a German ultralight and homebuilt aircraft with the project design headed by B&F Technik Vertrieb GmbH of Speyer and the aircraft produced by Podesva Air of the Czech Republic, introduced at the AERO Friedrichshafen show in 2013. The aircraft was built in a production run of ten aircraft and supplied complete and ready-to-fly. By 2017 it was no longer advertised for sale.

The aircraft is a replica of the 1934 Bücker Bü 131 Jungmann.

Design and development
The project to produce a batch of Bücker Bü 131 Jungmann replicas was headed by B&F's Peter Funk. Production commenced in 2013 with an initial batch of ten aircraft.

The design features a wire and strut-braced biplane layout, a two-seats in tandem open cockpit, fixed conventional landing gear and a single engine in tractor configuration.

The aircraft duplicates the original 1934 Bü 131's construction. Its  span wing is supported by cabane struts and a single set of parallel interplane struts outboard on the wings, with wire bracing. The standard engine used is the  Walter Micron IIIC four-stroke, inverted four cylinder, air-cooled powerplant.

Specifications (Fk131)

Notes

References

Fk131 Bücker Jungmann
2010s German ultralight aircraft
Single-engined tractor aircraft
Replica aircraft